The 1989 European Parliament election in Italy was held on 18 June 1989.

The election was paired with a non-binding referendum about the devolution of powers to the European Economic Community, which passed with overwhelming support from voters.

Electoral system
The pure party-list proportional representation was the traditional electoral system of the Italian Republic since its foundation in 1946, so it had been adopted to elect the Italian representatives to the European Parliament too. Two levels were used: a national level to divide seats between parties, and a constituency level to distribute them between candidates. Italian regions were united in 5 constituencies, each electing a group of deputies. At national level, seats were divided between party lists using the largest remainder method with Hare quota. All seats gained by each party were automatically distributed to their local open lists and their most voted candidates.

Results
For more than 35 years, Italian Communists had thought that their final victory was no more than a matter of time. However, the deindustrialization of Italy during the '80s showed that the time had expired. The decline of the traditional opponents of the Christian Democracy opened the door to new forms of protests: the Green Lists and, in Northern Italy, the Lombard League.

The government of Ciriaco De Mita did not survive to this vote: declining Italian Republican Party fired its leader Giovanni Spadolini, and the new secretary Giorgio La Malfa retired his support to the old PM. The Christian Democracy so chose a very expert new PM: Giulio Andreotti.

See also
 European Parliament

References

Italy
European Parliament elections in Italy
1989 elections in Italy